"Danger UXD" is an episode of the BBC sitcom, Only Fools and Horses. It was the second episode of series 6 and first broadcast on 15 January 1989. In the episode, Del acquires a batch of faulty sex dolls, which have inadvertently been filled with an explosive gas.

On 21 December 2006, a scene from this episode was voted 4th in UKTV Gold's "Top 40 Greatest Only Fools Moments". The scene in question was that when one of the blow up dolls inflates by itself, which causes Del Boy, Rodney, and Uncle Albert to leave the room in a panic.

Synopsis
While continuing to participate in the yuppy movement, Del Boy advises Rodney to partake. Del's latest items to sell are video recorders from Ronnie Nelson and fresh tomatoes from Jersey.

At the Nag's Head, Denzil tells the Trotters that he took his wife, Corrine, out for the evening the previous Friday to celebrate their anniversary, despite picking up a faulty stock of fifty dolls from a shop in High Wycombe and having to return them to the factory. Denzil had intended to return them the following Monday, but the factory burnt down on Saturday night so Denzil cannot return them, and has to hand in a form to confirm he collected the dolls but did not deliver them. Del forges a date and signature on the form and buys the dolls from Denzil.

Back at the flat, the Trotters discover that the dolls are uninflated sex dolls called Lusty Linda and Erotic Estelle. Del suggests that they take the dolls to a man named "Dirty Barry", who owns a sex shop.

At a Chinese takeaway, Denzil watches London Plus and finds out that the dolls are filled with propane gas, which will explode if exposed to heat, and is suspected to have caused the destruction of the factory. Worried for Del's life, Denzil hurries out of the takeaway after paying, but not claiming his meal.

That night, back at the flat, after Del finds that the video recorder has recorded the wrong programme, Rodney informs Del that the machines are made only for use in mainland Europe and cannot be used in the United Kingdom. Del admits that he has already sold most of them. At that moment, the two sex dolls from behind the cocktail bar inflate. The Trotters attempt to deflate the dolls, but cannot do so due to their faulty valves. Rodney suggests they burst them but is told not to by Del. When Rodney gets dressed for a date with Cassandra, Del gets an idea on how to get the dolls to Dirty Barry's.

Back at the Nag's Head, Trigger complains about the tomatoes, and Boycie turns out to be the one who bought the bulk of Del's faulty video recorders. Denzil rushes in and tells them about the dolls and how he has to get in touch with Del.

Outside Nelson Mandela House, Rodney and Del come out with the two dolls dressed in their late mother Joan's clothes. An old man mistakes them for real women and Del imitates a female voice. The Trotters throw the dolls in their van, and Rodney heads off to meet up with Cassandra, leaving Del and Albert to drive down to Dirty Barry's. Del and Albert arrive at Dirty Barry's shop, only to find out that he has had his licence revoked by the council and sold all his stock. With nowhere else to drop them off, Del and Albert head back to the van to think of another way to get rid of the dolls. Del thinks they should hold on to them until the market picks up again.

At a restaurant, Cassandra warns Rodney of the unexploded sex dolls that she has heard about on the news. Eventually, Del and Rodney quickly take the two inflated dolls and dump them in an abandoned area. The dolls explode after the Trotter brothers have got clear. The Trotter brothers head back to their van, only to find out that another doll is inflating. Del and Rodney bail out of the van and run off into the night.

Episode cast

Notes 
 The episode title is a reference to the 1979 TV series Danger UXB, where UXB stood for "unexploded bomb"; "UXD" thus suggests "unexploded dolls."

Story arc
 In this episode it is revealed that Denzil has established a new company, Transworld Express. This company is mentioned in a number of later episodes, such as "Mother Nature's Son" and marks a permanent career change for the character.
 The minor character Clayton Cooper would appear again in the 2010 prequel Rock & Chips as the boyfriend of Reenie Turpin. He does not appear in "Five Gold Rings" or "The Frog and the Pussycat", although it is unknown if he was to return in any of the four unproduced episodes.

Music
 UB40: "Come Out To Play"
 Erasure: "Stop"
 The Pasadenas: "Tribute (Right On)"
 The Waterboys: "Fisherman's Blues"
 Joe Jackson: "Is You Is or Is You Ain't My Baby"
 Joe Jackson: "Jack, You're Dead"

References

External links

1989 British television episodes
Dolls in fiction
Only Fools and Horses (series 6) episodes